Radyczyny-Kolonia  is a settlement in the administrative district of Gmina Przykona, within Turek County, Greater Poland Voivodeship, in west-central Poland.

References

Radyczyny-Kolonia